Ust-Yermilikha is a rural locality (a selo) in Kabanovsky Selsoviet, Ust-Kalmansky District, Altai Krai, Russia. The population was 77 as of 2013. There is 1 street.

Geography 
Ust-Yermilikha is located 41 km southwest of Ust-Kalmanka (the district's administrative centre) by road. Buranovo is the nearest rural locality.

References 

Rural localities in Ust-Kalmansky District